Frederick Walter Gascoyne Miller  (19 September 1904 – 12 October 1996) was a notable New Zealand journalist, goldminer, historian, poet and community worker. He was born in Hastings, New Zealand, on 19 September 1904.

In the 1975 Queen's Birthday Honours, Miller was appointed an Officer of the Order of the British Empire, for services to the community and literature. He was New Zealand's longest-serving journalist, having had a career in that industry for 74 years. He also served 24 years on the Invercargill Licensing Trust board.

He died in Invercargill on 12 October 1996, his wife following 20 months later. They are buried in Invercargill's Eastern Cemetery.

References

1904 births
1996 deaths
New Zealand miners
People from Hastings, New Zealand
New Zealand Officers of the Order of the British Empire
Invercargill Licensing Trust Board members
20th-century New Zealand journalists
Burials at Eastern Cemetery, Invercargill